Brian Bach Vandborg (born 4 December 1981) is a Danish former professional road bicycle racer, who competed as a professional between 2004 and 2013.

He won stage 4 of Tour de Georgia in 2005, his first professional victory, but the rest of his season was ruined due to a case of mononucleosis.

In 2006, Vandborg became a national champion by capturing the Danish Individual Time Trial Championship; he later finished fourth at the World Time Trial Championship.

Vandborg retired at the end of the 2013 season, after ten years as a professional.

Major results

2002
 National Under-23 Road Championships
1st  Time trial
3rd Road race
2003
 National Under-23 Road Championships
1st  Time trial
2nd Road race
 3rd Time trial, National Road Championships
 3rd Eschborn–Frankfurt Under–23
2004
 3rd Time trial, National Road Championships
 4th Overall Danmark Rundt
 9th Overall Tour of Georgia
2005
 1st Stage 4 Tour of Georgia
2006
 1st  Time trial, National Road Championships
 2nd Chrono des Nations
 3rd Overall Circuit Cycliste Sarthe
 4th Time trial, UCI Road World Championships
 5th Overall Circuit Franco-Belge
 6th Overall Bayern Rundfahrt
 7th Overall Étoile de Bessèges
2007
 1st Stage 2 Tour de l'Ain
 2nd Time trial, National Road Championships
2008
 1st Stage 3 Tour du Loir-et-Cher
 2nd Overall Circuit des Ardennes
 5th Duo Normand
 8th Chrono Champenois
2009
 National Road Championships
4th Road race
5th Time trial
2010
 6th Tre Valli Varesine
2012
 5th Time trial, National Road Championships
2013
 1st  Time trial, National Road Championships

Grand Tour general classification results timeline

References

External links 

Danish male cyclists
1981 births
Living people
Cyclists at the 2008 Summer Olympics
Olympic cyclists of Denmark
People from Herning Municipality
Sportspeople from the Central Denmark Region